The men's 400 metres at the 1934 European Athletics Championships was held in Turin, Italy, at the  Stadio Benito Mussolini on 7 and 8 September 1934.

Medalists

Results

Final
8 September

Heats
7 September

Heat 1

Heat 2

Heat 3

Participation
According to an unofficial count, 13 athletes from 9 countries participated in the event.

 (2)
 (1)
 (2)
 (1)
 (1)
 (2)
 (1)
 (1)
 (2)

References

400
400 metres at the European Athletics Championships